Oldwood may mean:

Oldwood, Shropshire - a hamlet in Shropshire, England
Oldwood, Worcestershire - a hamlet in Worcestershire, England
Leucosidea sericea - a species of evergreen tree and large shrub native to the Afromontane regions of Southern Africa.